Firouz Partovi (also written as Firooz Partovi) was born in 1936 in Tabriz, East Azerbaijan. He is an Iranian-American physicist and university Professor. Partovi received his PhD from the Massachusetts Institute of Technology in 1963, majoring in Physics. He founded faculty of physics in the Sharif University of Technology and he is the second professor of employment after Mohammad Ali Mojtahedi in Sharif University. Ali Partovi and Hadi Partovi are the sons of Firouz Partovi. He taught at the Sharif University of Technology, Amirkabir University of Technology, Massachusetts Institute of Technology and Harvard University.

Dr. Partovi has been employee number two of Sharif University (second only to the late Dr. Mohammad Ali Mojtahedi himself). He was a young Physics professor in Polytechnique University when he was approached by Dr. Mojtahedi about the establishment of the then Aryamher University. Together they managed to recruit the first generation of the staff and faculty for the university. As an energetic young professor working through the first years of university, Dr. Partovi's footprint can be seen everywhere on Sharif campus. Dr. Partovi founded the Physics department and was its professor from 1965 to 1985, as well as its chairman for a number of years. Moreover, he designed the program to computerize the student registration and record keeping.

Dr. Partovi is a graduate of MIT and in addition to Sharif University, has worked at MIT, Harvard, Tehran Polytechnique, and Mazandaran University (where he was one of the founders), in areas covering nuclear physics, laser surgery, voice recognition, and computer science as applied to financial markets. Dr. Partovi's impeccable track record and likeable personality has made him highly respected among his peers and former students.

Dr. Partovi currently lives in Seattle. In 2018, he won the Dr. Amin Lifetime Achievement Award from Sharif University of Technology Association (SUTA).

References

External links
 
 Firouz Partovi

Iranian physicists
21st-century American physicists
Iranian expatriate academics
Alborz High School alumni
Massachusetts Institute of Technology alumni
Academic staff of Sharif University of Technology
Academic staff of Amirkabir University of Technology
Massachusetts Institute of Technology faculty
Harvard University faculty
1936 births
Living people
People from Tabriz
Iranian emigrants to the United States